During the 1988–89 English football season, Gillingham F.C. competed in the Football League Third Division, the third tier of the English football league system.  It was the 57th season in which Gillingham competed in the Football League, and the 39th since the club was voted back into the league in 1950.  Gillingham began the season well, with two wins in the first three Third Division games, but then lost ten consecutive league games to slip close to the bottom of the league table.  In late October, after the eighth of these defeats, Paul Taylor was dismissed as the club's manager and replaced by Keith Burkinshaw. The new manager could not significantly improve the team's performances, resigning in April with Gillingham bottom of the table. Former Gillingham player Damien Richardson ended the season as the club's manager. Gillingham finished the season 23rd out of 24 teams in the division and were relegated to the Fourth Division.

Gillingham also competed in three knock-out competitions. The team were eliminated in the first round of the FA Cup and the second round of the Football League Cup.  Gillingham progressed from the initial group stage of the Associate Members' Cup but lost in the first round proper. The team played a total of 55 competitive matches, winning 15, drawing 5 and losing 35.  Steve Lovell was the team's top goalscorer for the second consecutive season; he scored 14 goals in Third Division matches and a total of 17 in all competitions. George Burley, in his only season with the club, made the most appearances; he was absent for only one game.  The highest attendance recorded at the club's home ground, Priestfield Stadium, was 5,871 for a league game against Fulham on 26 December 1988.

Background and pre-season
The 1988–89 season was Gillingham's 57th season playing in the Football League and the 39th since the club was elected back into the League in 1950 after being voted out in 1938. It was the club's 15th consecutive season in the Football League Third Division, the third tier of the English football league system, since the team had gained promotion from the Fourth Division as runners-up in 1974.  In the 1987–88 season, Gillingham had finished 13th in the Third Division; Keith Peacock was dismissed from his position as the club's manager midway through that season and replaced by his assistant Paul Taylor, who remained in the role at the start of the 1988–89 season.  Taylor's management team consisted of John Gorman as assistant manager and former Gillingham player Damien Richardson as youth team coach.

Gillingham's kit for the season added a pattern of thin white lines to the team's traditional blue shirts, which were worn with white shorts and socks.  The second-choice kit, to be worn in the event of a clash of colours with the opposition, was all-red.  Taylor signed one new player ahead of the new season: George Burley, a 32-year-old defender who had played nearly 450 games in the Football League, joined the club from Sunderland.  Mel Eves, Les Berry and Graham Pearce all moved on after their playing contracts were not renewed.  The team prepared for the new season with a number of friendly matches, including a short tour of France where they played teams including Racing Club de Paris.

Third Division

August–December

Gillingham's first game of the season took place at their home ground, Priestfield Stadium, on 27 August against Swansea City, who won 3–2; Burley made his debut, as did Brian Clarke, a teenaged defender from the youth team.  Gillingham won the next two games, away to Aldershot and at home to Sheffield United; Jerry Williams, a midfielder newly signed from Reading, made his debut in the latter game.  Gillingham extended their unbeaten league run to three games with a 1–1 draw against Huddersfield Town on 17 September, in which Steve Lovell scored a goal for the fourth consecutive game.  The result left Gillingham sixth in the league table after four games, but the team then began a run of consecutive league defeats which would last for nearly two months. The sequence began with a 2–1 defeat away to Mansfield Town on 20 September and continued with four games in which Gillingham failed to score any goals, losing to Reading, Brentford, Bristol City and Chesterfield, after which the team had fallen to 20th in the table, only one position above the four relegation places.

On 25 October, Gillingham lost 5–0 away to Preston North End, the team's eighth consecutive league defeat; the following day Taylor was dismissed from his role as manager by the club's board of directors.  Youth team coach Richardson and Bill Collins, who had retired at the end of the previous season after more than 20 years with the club as youth team coach and later first team trainer, took temporary charge of the team for the game at home to Wolverhampton Wanderers on 29 October, which resulted in another defeat.  Two days later, Keith Burkinshaw was confirmed as the club's new manager; the appointment was seen as a coup for Gillingham as Burkinshaw had previously managed at the highest level with Tottenham Hotspur, winning the FA Cup twice and the UEFA Cup once.  In his first game in charge, away to Cardiff City, Gillingham lost 1–0, the team's 10th consecutive Third Division defeat.  The result left the team in 22nd place, six points below 20th position and off the bottom of the table only on goal difference.  The run of consecutive defeats finally came to an end on 8 November when a goal from Burley gave Gillingham a 1–0 win at home to Blackpool.

Gillingham's league results alternated between victory and defeat for the remainder of 1988.  Lovell scored twice in a 2–1 win away to Northampton Town on 18 December to take his total league goals for the season to 10; no other Gillingham player had scored more than twice in Third Division games.  It was Gillingham's second consecutive away victory following a run of seven away games without a win dating back to early September.  On 26 December the team lost 1–0 at home to Fulham in front of a crowd of 5,871, the largest attendance of the season at Priestfield.  Gillingham's final match of 1988 resulted in a 1–0 win over Port Vale, who had been second in the league table going into the game; Gillingham finished the year still 22nd in the Third Division, although their position had improved as they were now below 20th place only on goal difference.

January–May

Gillingham began the new year with a 3–0 defeat away to Wigan Athletic and four days later lost 2–1 away to Bolton Wanderers, although other teams' results meant that Gillingham did not drop any lower in the table, remaining 22nd.  They drew 1–1 at home to Aldershot and ended the month with defeats away to Sheffield United and at home to Huddersfield Town.  Mark Stimson, a young defender signed on loan from Burkinshaw's former club Tottenham Hotspur of the First Division, made his debut against Sheffield United.  At the end of January, Gillingham were 23rd in the table, ahead of bottom-placed Aldershot only on goal difference.  Days later, club chairman Roy Wood stepped down after three years and was replaced by Martin Lukehurst.  Gillingham's winless run continued throughout February, during which they drew twice and lost three times.  After a goalless draw at home to Brentford on 4 February, Gillingham were bottom of the Third Division and remained there at the end of the month.    

Burkinshaw continued to sign new players; Tim O'Shea, a defender who had joined from Leyton Orient, played for the first time against Brentford.  Two new players debuted on 11 February against Bristol City: another new arrival from Tottenham, midfielder Billy Manuel, and Alan Reeves, a defender signed on loan from Norwich City.  Francis Joseph, a forward signed from Sheffield United, debuted  against Preston North End on 28 February.  Gillingham lost their first two games of March and remained bottom of the table.  Pat Gavin, a forward signed on a trial basis from Hanwell Town of the semi-professional Spartan League, made his debut on 14 March against Wolverhampton Wanderers and scored Gillingham's only goal in a 6–1 defeat; it was the first time Gillingham had conceded six goals in a game since December 1987.  Gavin also scored in both of the next two games, including a 2–1 win at home to Wigan Athletic on 24 March which gave Gillingham their first victory of 1989.  Three days later the team won away to Fulham by the same score, the first occasion on which they had won two consecutive Third Division games since the previous September.

On 11 April, with the team bottom of the Third Division, Burkinshaw resigned as manager.  His assistant Keith Blunt was appointed as caretaker manager and the team won their next match against Mansfield Town, but Blunt was himself dismissed after one week in charge and Richardson again put in temporary charge.  Barry Bright, the club's chief executive, said that he had received around twenty applications for the managerial position and anticipated drawing up a shortlist of around five, of which Richardson would be one.  Richardson's first game in charge ended in the team's second consecutive victory, a 2–1 win away to Reading, but Gillingham lost their next two games.  Defeat at Blackpool on 1 May meant that Gillingham could no longer overtake the team then in 20th place, confirming that the club would be relegated to the Fourth Division at the end of the season.  Four days later, with two games of the season remaining, Richardson was appointed manager on a permanent basis.  The following day, the team lost their third consecutive game, being defeated 2–0 by Chester City.  Gillingham's last game of the season resulted in a 2–1 victory at home to Notts County with goals from Gavin and Manuel;  Gavin took his total to 7 goals in 13 games but was sent off later in the match.  Gillingham finished 23rd in the league table, 14 points below 20th-placed Northampton Town, and were thus relegated to the Fourth Division, ending a spell of 15 years at the third tier of English football.

Match details
Key

In result column, Gillingham's score shown first
H = Home match
A = Away match

pen. = Penalty kick
o.g. = Own goal

Results

Partial league table

Cup matches

FA Cup
As a Third Division team, Gillingham entered the 1988–89 FA Cup in the first round and were paired with Peterborough United of the Fourth Division.  Peterborough took a 2–0 lead but Gillingham then scored three times.  Peterborough scored again three minutes from the end of the game, however, and the match ended in a 3–3 draw, necessitating a replay at Peterborough's London Road Stadium.  The score in the second match was 0–0 at the end of the regulation 90 minutes, but the rules of the competition meant that, unlike in the first match, 30 minutes of extra time were played.  Gillingham's Ivan Haines scored an own goal during the extra period and Gillingham lost 1–0 and were eliminated from the FA Cup.

Match details
Key

In result column, Gillingham's score shown first
H = Home match
A = Away match

pen. = Penalty kick
o.g. = Own goal

Results

Football League Cup
As a Third Division team, Gillingham entered the 1988–89 Football League Cup in the first round; their opponents were Cambridge United of the Fourth Division.  Gillingham won the first leg of the two-legged tie 2–1 and the second 3–1 to win 5–2 on aggregate.  In the second round they were drawn to play Millwall of the First Division, the highest level of English football.  Millwall won the first leg 3–0 and the second 3–1 to eliminate Gillingham from the competition.

Match details
Key

In result column, Gillingham's score shown first
H = Home match
A = Away match

pen. = Penalty kick
o.g. = Own goal

Results

Associate Members' Cup
The 1988–89 Associate Members' Cup, a tournament exclusively for Third and Fourth Division teams, began with a preliminary round in which the teams were drawn into groups of three, contested on a round-robin basis.  Gillingham's group also included fellow Third Division teams Brentford and Fulham.  Gillingham first played Brentford and lost 2–0; Brentford had already defeated Fulham and with maximum points from their two games were guaranteed to top the group, meaning that the result of the match between Gillingham and Fulham would determine which team joined them in the first round proper.  The match took place at Priestfield and drew a crowd of 1,970, the lowest recorded at the stadium during the season.  Gillingham won 2–1 and moved on to the first round, where they were drawn to play Torquay United of the Fourth Division; despite playing a team from the lower division, Gillingham lost the game 3–0 and their participation in the competition came to an end.

Match details
Key

In result column, Gillingham's score shown first
H = Home match
A = Away match

pen. = Penalty kick
o.g. = Own goal

Results

Players

Thirty-two players made at least one appearance for Gillingham during the season.  Burley made the most; he played in 54 of the team's 55 competitive matches, missing only the second leg of the first round of the League Cup.  Gavin Peacock had the second highest number of appearances, with 52, and four other players played between 40 and 50 times: Dave Smith, Lovell, Ian Docker and Paul Haylock.  Two players made only one appearance: Eamonn Collins, who had a brief loan spell at Gillingham, and Irvin Gernon, who was transferred to Reading early in the season. 

Lovell was the team's top goalscorer, with 14 goals in Third Division matches and a total of 17 in all competitions.  It was the second consecutive season in which he was Gillingham's top scorer.  Peacock was second highest scorer with 10 goals and Gavin had the third highest total with 7, despite joining the club with only two months of the season remaining.

FW = Forward, MF = Midfielder, GK = Goalkeeper, DF = Defender

Aftermath
Peacock was voted the club's player of the year, but following the team's relegation he was signed by AFC Bournemouth of the Second Division, as was Phil Kite. Smith and Burley also left the club.  After he impressed during his trial period with the club, Gillingham signed Gavin to a three-year contract at the end of the season, but it was not registered with the Football League, and Leicester City of the Second Division signed the player, which they were able to do without having to pay any transfer fee as he was not technically under contract at Gillingham.  After a Football League inquiry, Gavin's move to Leicester was ruled valid, but it was agreed that he should be loaned back to Gillingham for the 1989–90 season.  He could not recapture his previous form, however, and scored only once in 39 games.

Richardson remained as manager for the 1989–90 season, and veteran player Ron Hillyard was appointed to be his assistant. For much of the season, Gillingham were in contention for promotion back to the Third Division at the first attempt, but the team slipped down the table after losing six consecutive games in the latter stages of the season and finished 14th in the Fourth Division.  The club ultimately spent seven seasons at the fourth level of English football before achieving promotion in 1996.

References

Works cited

Gillingham F.C. seasons
Gillingham Fc Season, 1988-89